Captrust Tower is a 17-story  mixed use high-rise building located in North Hills, Raleigh, North Carolina. The tower opened in the fall of 2009. It is named for Captrust Financial Advisors, the first tenant, which uses  on the top two floors for its headquarters. Captrust Tower was built by Duke Realty Corp. of Indianapolis and Kane Realty Corp. of Raleigh. KSB realty Advisors of Newport Beach, California announced its $98.4 million purchase of the building January 31, 2013.

When the tower was announced in 2007, Captrust Financial Advisors had 75 employees and managed $20 billion in assets, with plans to expand westward. The company advised companies with retirement plans as well as individuals.

References

External links

Office buildings completed in 2009
Skyscraper office buildings in Raleigh, North Carolina
2009 establishments in North Carolina